Abatus curvidens is a species of sea urchin of the family Schizasteridae. Their armour is covered with spines. It is in the genus Abatus and lives in the sea. Abatus curvidens was first scientifically described in 1836 by Ole Mortensen.

References 

Spatangoida
Animals described in 1836
Taxa named by Ole Theodor Jensen Mortensen